The Journal of Early Adolescence is a peer-reviewed academic journal that publishes papers in the field of Psychology. The journal's editor is Alexander T Vazsonyi (University of Kentucky). It has been in publication since 1981 and is currently published by SAGE Publications.

Abstracting and indexing 
The Journal of Early Adolescence is abstracted and indexed in, among other databases:  SCOPUS, and the Social Sciences Citation Index. According to the Journal Citation Reports, its 2017 impact factor is 1.828, ranking it 39 out of 73 journals in the category ‘Psychology, Developmental’. and 19 out of 46 journals in the category ‘Family Studies’.

References

External links 
 

SAGE Publishing academic journals
English-language journals
Adolescence journals
Publications established in 1981
9 times per year journals